Djangou Airport  is an airport serving Dapaong (also known as Dapaongo or Dapango), a city in the Savanes Region in Togo.

Facilities

References

External links
 

Airports in Togo
Savanes Region, Togo